Lycée Pasteur de São Paulo is a French international school located in Chácara Klabin, in Vila Mariana district of São Paulo.  The school serves the levels maternelle (preschool) through lycée (senior high school).

See also
 French Brazilian

References

External links
  Lycée Français Pasteur de São Paulo
  Liceu Pasteur de São Paulo Unidade Vergueiro

European-Brazilian culture in São Paulo
French international schools in Brazil
International schools in São Paulo